These are the official results of the women's javelin throw event at the 1992 Summer Olympics in Barcelona, Spain. There were a total of 25 participating athletes. The top 12 and ties, and all those reaching 62.50 metres advanced to the final. The javelin used was an "old design" rough surfaced javelin.

Medalists

Abbreviations

Records

The World and Olympic record holder Petra Felke competed in this event under the name Petra Meier.

Qualification

Group A

Group B

Final

See also
 1990 Women's European Championships Javelin Throw (Split)
 1991 Women's World Championship Javelin Throw (Tokyo)
 1993 Women's World Championships Javelin Throw (Stuttgart)
 1994 Women's European Championships Javelin Throw (Helsinki)

References

External links
 Official Report
 Results

J
Javelin throw at the Olympics
1992 in women's athletics
Women's events at the 1992 Summer Olympics